Peter Darbyshire is a Canadian journalist, blogger and author. An editor and journalist with Canadian newspaper The Province and a self-published blogger and cartoonist, he has published literary fiction under his own name and fantasy literature under the pen name Peter Roman.

He won the ReLit Award for fiction in 2003 for his novel Please.

Works

Standalone works and short stories
Includes standalone stories, novelettes, and novellas.
 Please (2003)
 The Warhol Gang (2010)
 I'd Never Been Shot for Real Before (2014, ASIN: B00L9KZ726)

Book of Cross series
Writing as Peter Roman.
 The Mona Lisa Sacrifice (2013)
 The Dead Hamlets (2015)
 The Apocalypse Ark (2016)

References

External links
 

Canadian male journalists
Canadian bloggers
Living people
Canadian male novelists
Canadian male short story writers
Canadian fantasy writers
Writers from Vancouver
Canadian male non-fiction writers
Male bloggers
21st-century Canadian journalists
21st-century Canadian male writers
21st-century Canadian novelists
21st-century Canadian short story writers
Year of birth missing (living people)